Dean Kelly (born 1977, Galway) is an Irish painter and photographer. His works 'chronicle changes in Irish society through recent years'.

Between 1995 and 2001 Kelly was a member of Macnas Theatre & Spectacle, Galway. (He was prop and theatre designer, and sculptor of a number of 'cabezudos' style caricature heads. These 'massive heads' were later used on Chris Evans' Channel 4 (UK) 'TFI Friday' show in the late 1990s).

In 2015 the artist was included in the National Irish Visual Arts Library (NIVAL) database of Irish artists.

Selected exhibitions

 2019 National Heritage Week, Dean Kelly, 'City Studies', from August 17th, new paintings and photographs at The Kenny Gallery, Galway
2015 April Cúírt International Literature Festival, Latin Quarter Art Trail. Curated by Margaret Nolan.
 2012 Dean Kelly & Shane Crotty 'Pretty Pictures' – Two man show, Kenny Gallery, Galway. Official opening by Páraic Breathnach.
 2008 'Modus Operandi?' - Solo exhibition, Kenny Gallery, Galway. Official opening by Tom Kenny.
 2005 'Listening Eyes' – Invited Group, Music for Galway anniversary exhibition – Norman Villa Gallery, with John Behan RHA. Official opening by Enrique Juncosa, Director IMMA.
 2004 'Core' collective - Group exhibition, NUI, Galway Gallery. Official opening by Michael D.Higgins (then TD, later President of Ireland).
 2001–present Collection, The Kenny Gallery, Galway.

References

External links
Dean Kelly's website

1977 births
Irish painters
Irish photographers
People from Galway (city)
Living people